
Radzyń Podlaski County is a unit of territorial administration and local government (powiat) in Lublin Voivodeship, eastern Poland. It was established on January 1, 1999, as a result of the Polish local government reforms passed in 1998.

As of 2019, its total population is 59,057, including a population of 15,709 Radzyń Podlaski and a rural population of 43,348.

Neighbouring counties
Radzyń Podlaski County is bordered by Biała Podlaska County to the north-east, Parczew County to the south-east, Lubartów County to the south and Łuków County to the north-west.

Administrative division
The county is subdivided into eight gminas (one urban and seven rural). These are listed in the following table, in descending order of population.

References

 
Land counties of Lublin Voivodeship